Neoiphinoe is a genus of small sea snails, marine gastropod mollusks in the family Capulidae, the cap snails.

Species
Species within the genus Neoiphinoe include:
 Neoiphinoe arctica (Middendorff, 1849)
 Neoiphinoe coronata (Gould, 1860)
 Neoiphinoe echinata (Egorov & Alexeyev, 1998)
 Neoiphinoe kroeyeri (Philippi, 1849)
 Neoiphinoe ovoidea (Egorov & Alexeyev, 1998)
 Neoiphinoe permabilis (Dall, 1871)
 Neoiphinoe triseriata (Golikov, 1986)

References

External links

Capulidae
Monotypic gastropod genera